Matawinie is a regional county municipality in the region of Lanaudière in southwestern Quebec, Canada. Its seat is Rawdon. The population according to the 2021 Canadian Census was 55,500.

Subdivisions 
There are 27 subdivisions within the RCM:

Municipalities (14)
 Chertsey
 Entrelacs
 Notre-Dame-de-la-Merci
 Rawdon
 Saint-Alphonse-Rodriguez
 Sainte-Béatrix
 Saint-Côme
 Saint-Donat
 Sainte-Émélie-de-l'Énergie
 Saint-Félix-de-Valois
 Saint-Jean-de-Matha
 Sainte-Marcelline-de-Kildare
 Saint-Michel-des-Saints
 Saint-Zénon

Parishes (1)
 Saint-Damien

Unorganized Territory (12)
 Baie-Atibenne
 Baie-de-la-Bouteille
 Baie-Obaoca
 Lac-Cabasta
 Lac-des-Dix-Milles
 Lac-Devenyns
 Lac-du-Taureau
 Lac-Legendre
 Lac-Matawin
 Lac-Minaki
 Lac-Santé
 Saint-Guillaume-Nord

First Nations reserve (1)
 Manawan

Demographics

Population

Language
French and Atikamekw are the main languages.

Transportation

Access Routes
Highways and numbered routes that run through the municipality, including external routes that start or finish at the county border:

 Autoroutes
 None

 Principal Highways
 
 

 Secondary Highways
 
 
 
 
 
 

 External Routes
 None

See also
 List of regional county municipalities and equivalent territories in Quebec

References
 Répertoire des municipalités du Québec

External links
Matawinie MRC - official website